The Ang Bagong Lipunan Series (literally, ”The New Society Series") is the name used to refer to Philippine banknotes and coins issued by the Central Bank of the Philippines from 1973 to 1985. It was succeeded by the New Design series of banknotes. The lowest denomination of the series is 2-piso and the highest is 100-piso.

Background
After the declaration of martial law by President Ferdinand Marcos on September 23, 1972, the Central Bank was to demonetize the existing banknotes in 1974, pursuant to Presidential Decree 378. All the unissued Pilipino Series banknotes (except the one peso banknote) were sent back to the De La Rue plant in London for overprinting the watermark area with the words "ANG BAGONG LIPUNAN" and an oval geometric safety design. The one peso note was replaced with the two peso note, which features the same elements of the demonetized "Pilipino" series one peso note.

On September 7, 1978, the Security Printing Plant in Quezon City was inaugurated to produce banknotes inside the country. Alongside the opening of its printing facilities, the seal of the Bangko Sentral ng Pilipinas was given minor changes.

The banknotes were still legal tender even after the introduction of the New Design Series banknotes, however, it was seldom used after the EDSA Revolution. The banknotes were eventually demonetized on February 2, 1993 (but can still be exchange with legal tender currency to the Central Bank until February 2, 1996) after clamors that the banknotes can be used to buy votes for the 1992 Presidential Elections.

Banknotes

Coins

Design

Banknotes

2 pesos
Colored blue, the main design on the front of the note featured a portrait of the National hero of the Philippines, José Rizal and the scene of the Declaration of Philippine Independence on the back side of the note.

5 pesos
Colored green, the main design on the front of the note featured a portrait of revolutionary leader Andrés Bonifacio and the Blood Compact of the Katipuneros on the back side of the note.

10 pesos
Colored brown, the main design on the front of the note featured a portrait of Apolinario Mabini and the Barasoain Church, site of the drafting of the Malolos Constitution and the inauguration of the First Philippine Republic, on the back side of the note.

20 pesos
Colored orange, the main design on the front of the note featured a portrait of Philippine president Manuel L. Quezon and the Malacañang Palace, the official residence and workplace of the President of the Philippines, on the back side of the note.

50 pesos
Colored red, the main design on the front of the note featured a portrait of Philippine president Sergio Osmeña and the Old Legislative Building (now the National Museum of Fine Arts) on the back side of the note.

100 pesos
Colored violet, the main design on the front of the note featured a portrait of Philippine president Manuel A. Roxas and the main complex of the Bangko Sentral ng Pilipinas on the back side of the note. Two versions of this denomination were issued during the series' lifespan, one featured the former headquarters of the Bangko Sentral ng Pilipinas (Aduana Building) in Intramuros, a design carried over from the Pilipino Series 100 pesos banknote. The denomination was reissued featuring the then new main complex of the Bangko Sentral ng Pilipinas as its main design.

Coins

1 sentimo
Struck in aluminum, the obverse side of the coin features the state title, the denomination and a portrait of Lapulapu. The reverse side of the coin features the seal of the Bangko Sentral ng Pilipinas.

5 sentimos
Struck in brass, the obverse side of the coin features the state title, the denomination and a portrait of Melchora Aquino. The reverse side of the coin features the seal of the Bangko Sentral ng Pilipinas.

10 sentimos
Struck in copper-nickel, the obverse side of the coin features the state title, the denomination and a portrait of Francisco Baltazar. The reverse side of the coin features the seal of the Bangko Sentral ng Pilipinas.

25 sentimos
Struck in copper-nickel, the obverse side of the coin features the state title, the denomination and a portrait of Juan Luna. The reverse side of the coin features the seal of the Bangko Sentral ng Pilipinas.

1 peso
Struck in copper-nickel, the obverse side of the coin features the state title, the denomination and a portrait of José Rizal. The reverse side of the coin features the Coat of arms of the Philippines. The first version, minted from 1975 to 1978, featured a scroll with the inscription Republika ng Pilipinas (Republic of the Philippines). The second version, minted from 1978 to 1982, featured a scroll with the inscription ISANG BANSA, ISANG DIWA (One Nation, One Spirit).

5 pesos
Struck in nickel, the obverse side of the coin features the inscription "Ang Bagong Lipunan" (The New Society), a profile of Ferdinand E. Marcos and his rise to power, "SETYEMBRE 21, 1972". The reverse side of the coin features the Coat of arms of the Philippines.

Commemorative issues
Aside from minting expensive commemorative coins for special occasions, overprinted circulating banknotes. The first circulated banknote was in 1978 for the birth centenary of former President Sergio Osmeña; the words IKA-100 TAONG KAARAWAN 1878-1978 were placed near his portrait on the 50-peso banknote.

The next overprint was in 1981 when Pope John Paul II visited the Philippines from February 17 to 21, 1981. The overprint was on the 2-peso banknote on the watermark area. On June 30, 1981, the bust profile of President Marcos were overprinted on the 10-peso banknote to mark his Inauguration on that date.

In 1981, the Central Bank Ad Hoc Committee was authorized to approve or reject designs of circulating banknotes and coins, including commemorative banknotes and coins.

See also
 Philippine peso
 Banknotes of the Philippine peso
 Coins of the Philippine peso

References

 Ang Bagong Lipunan Series in philmoney.blogspot.com

External links
 Philippine Banknotes and Coins
 Philippine Coins News & Updates

Philippines currency history
Banknotes of the Philippines